A.N.M Nuruzzaman  (December 1938 – 16 March 1993) was a Bangladeshi army officer, who was also a sector commander in the Bangladeshi War of Liberation. After the war he served as the first and only director general of the paramilitary force, Jatiya Rakkhi Bahini.

Biography
Nuruzzaman was born in December 1938 in Saidabad, Raipura, Narsingdi. Abu Ahmad, his father, was a government officer. He graduated from Sunamganj High School and Sylhet Murari Chand College. He graduated from University of Dhaka in 1959 and afterward joined Pakistan Military Academy. In 1960 he was commissioned in the Pakistan army as second lieutenant.

Career 
In 1968 he was promoted to the rank of Captain and posted in Quetta, West Pakistan.

Agartala Conspiracy case
He was one of the accused in the Agartala Conspiracy Case. After the Agartala Conspiracy Case was withdrawn he was reinstated in service.

Bangladesh Liberation war
Nuruzzaman joined the War of liberation in 1971 in the S-Force under KM Shafiullah, commander of Sector-3. In September he was made the commander of sector-3 by the Mujibnagar Government. He served in that position till the end of Bangladesh Liberation War.

Post Independence
He joined the Bangladesh army after the independence of Bangladesh, he was promoted to Brigadier general. On 28 January 1972, he and Anwar Ul Alam meet to discuss the formation of Rakhi Bahini in Gonobhaban. In March 1972 Rakhi Bahini came into existence. He was the director of Jatiyo Rakkhi Bahini. A cable from Dhaka American embassy was sent to note that he left for the United States on 11 August 1975. The cable was sent on 14 August 1975. He was in London when Sheikh Mujib was assassinated in 1975. After the Assassination of Bangladesh Liberation war in 1975 he was placed under the Ministry of Foreign Affairs, and performed diplomatic responsibilities in Australia, Philippines, Senegal, Canada and Sweden.

Death 
He died on 16 March 1993 at Stockholm while working as ambassador of Bangladesh to Sweden.

Legacy
The Government of Bangladesh awarded him the highest living gallantry award Bir Uttam for his role in the Bangladesh Liberation War. Dhaka City Corporation renamed a road Bir Uttam ANM Nuruzzaman Sarak after him.

Footnotes

References

1938 births
1993 deaths
Ambassadors of Bangladesh to Sweden
Bangladesh Army generals
Recipients of the Bir Uttom
Mukti Bahini personnel
Bangladesh Krishak Sramik Awami League central committee members